Marginella floccata (Wooly Marginella) is a species of sea snail, a marine gastropod mollusk in the family Marginellidae, the margin snails.

Description
Shells can be tan, white, or yellow with rows of darker dots, dark mottling, or stripes. Size is 22-30mm for a mature specimen.

Distribution
Found in South Africa, mainly along capes and bays.

References

Marginellidae
Gastropods described in 1889